Communist nostalgia, also called communism nostalgia or socialist nostalgia, is the nostalgia in various post-communist states of Central and Eastern Europe and Russia for the prior communist states.

Examples of such nostalgia can be observed in East Germany, Poland, the former Soviet Union, former Yugoslavia, Bulgaria, Hungary, Romania, the Czech Republic, Albania, and Slovakia. Businesses have commercialized and commodified communist nostalgia in the form of communist fashion or commodities (a process known as communist chic).

Insight
Dominik Bartmanski notes that after the anti-communist revolutions of 1989, the specific perspectives of the development remained unclear for some time, they were expressed in generic terms such as "return to Europe", "to Western values" and the like. This resulted in utopian expectations regarding capitalism and democracy. When confronted with the hardships of the transition, the "post-revolutionary utopianism" produced "post-revolutionary  disenchantment".

According to Kristen R. Ghodsee, a researcher on post-communist Eastern Europe:

Polling

Hungary
A 2010 Pew poll found that 72% of Hungarians said that most people in their country were worse off economically than they had been under communism. Only 8% said that most people in Hungary were better off, and 16% said that things were about the same. The poll also found that 42% disapproved of the move away from communism.

Slovakia
A 2018 poll in Slovakia found that 81% agreed that people helped each other more during communism, were more sympathetic and closer to each other. 79% asserted that people lived in a safer environment during socialism and that violent crimes were less frequent. Another 77% claimed that thanks to the planned economy, there was enough useful work for all and therefore no unemployment.

Romania
A 2014 poll found that 44% of the respondents believed that living conditions had been better under communism. A 2010 poll conducted by the Romanian Institute for Evaluation and Strategy provided similar results. Of the 1,460 respondents, 54% claimed that they had experienced better living standards during communism, while 16 percent said that they had been worse.

See also
 Nostalgia for the Polish People's Republic
 Nostalgia for the Soviet Union
 Ostalgie
 Yugo-nostalgia

References

Further reading
 Rebecca Mckee, Erica Richardson, Bayard Roberts, Christian Haerpfer and Martin Mckee, "Things Can Only Get Better? Changing Views of the Past, Present and Future in the Former Soviet Union", Europe-Asia Studies, Vol. 65, No. 7, 2013, pp. 1466-1478, 
 From the abstract: "We report new analyses from eight former Soviet republics, and from two surveys, in 2001 and 2010, comparing attitudes to government in the Soviet period and at the time of the surveys, as well as expectations for the future. Everywhere, views of the past have become less positive and those of the present more positive. However, both the views in each survey and the change between each of them vary among countries and socio-demographic groups."

 
Central Europe
Eastern Europe
Russian culture
German culture
Ostalgie